Rotary English Medium School, founded in 1979, was the first English medium school in Ranibennur. 
Started by the local chapter of the Rotary International Club, this school has played a pioneering effort in advancing the educational needs of the people around Ranibennur taluk.

Among the founding members of the school were Mr Veerabhadra Shetty, Dr K. S. Nadiger, Dr C. V. Punit and other eminent local personalities. The first head mistress of the school was Ms. Sumangala.  She was succeeded by Mrs. Mariamma Mathen, who headed the institution for almost 15 years.  The school is currently under the management of Mr. V. P. Linganagoudar as general secretary.

School And College  Website
http://tagoreeducationsociety.org

Schools in Haveri district
Educational institutions established in 1979
1979 establishments in Karnataka